Ramón Ismael Medina Bello (born 29 April 1966 in Gualeguay, Entre Rios), nicknamed El Mencho, is an Argentine former football striker who has played at club level in Argentina and Japan.

He began his professional football career in 1986 with Racing Club de Avellaneda. In 1989, he was transferred to River Plate, where he played until 1993. By that time he was part of the Argentina national team, with whom he won the 1991 Copa América in Chile. He was also part of the national team in the 1994 FIFA World Cup.

Medina Bello went to play in Japan for the Yokohama Marinos until 1996 when he returned to River Plate. He retired in 1999 in Talleres and after two years of retirement played for Dock Sud in the Argentine Soccer League Fourth Division. In 2005, he played for Juventud Unida where he retired for good.

Career statistics

Club

International

FIFA World Cup appearances
He appeared in 2 games during the 1994 FIFA World Cup.

 30 June 1994: Argentina – Bulgaria 0–2 ( In the 67th minute he replaced Leonardo Rodriguez )
 3 July 1994: Romania – Argentina 3–2 ( In the 63rd minute he replaced Roberto Sensini )

Honours

Club
Racing Club
 Supercopa Sudamericana: 1988

 (River Plate)
 Primera División Argentina: 1990 
 Primera División Argentina: 1991 Apertura, 1993 Apertura, 1996 Apertura, 1997 Clausura, 1997 Apertura
 Copa Libertadores de América: 1996
 Supercopa Sudamericana:  1997

Talleres de Cordoba
 Primera B Nacional: 1998

International
Argentina
 Copa América: 1991, 1993

References

External links
 Argentine Primera statistics at Fútbol XXI  
 

 Unofficial site

Argentine footballers
Argentine expatriate footballers
1966 births
Living people
Racing Club de Avellaneda footballers
Club Atlético River Plate footballers
Yokohama F. Marinos players
J1 League players
Expatriate footballers in Japan
Talleres de Córdoba footballers
Sportspeople from Entre Ríos Province
1994 FIFA World Cup players
1991 Copa América players
1993 Copa América players
Argentina international footballers
Argentine Primera División players
Primera Nacional players
Copa América-winning players
Association football forwards